Juan Luis "Tati" Rascón Lope (born 2 March 1971) is a Spanish professional tennis player.

ATP Challenger and ITF Futures finals

Singles: 11 (10–1)

Doubles: 1 (0–1)

Performance timeline

Singles

External links 
 
 

Spanish male tennis players
1971 births
Living people
Tennis players from Madrid